Must Love Kids is a reality dating show that debuted on TLC in the United States on July 15, 2008. The series followed three single moms as they entered the world of dating. The moms had to balance their careers and raise their children while trying to find a lifelong partner. Must Love Kids was based on the Swedish format Single Moms first aired on TV3 in Sweden in 2007. The format was developed by Friday TV.

Cast

International versions

Production
Must Love Kids was produced by the production company Rocket Science Laboratories, also responsible for the Fox series Joe Millionaire. The format Single Moms is distributed by Shine International, the international distribution arm of the Shine Group.

See also
 List of reality television show franchises
 List of television show franchises

References

2000s American reality television series
2008 American television series debuts
2008 American television series endings
TLC (TV network) original programming
American dating and relationship reality television series
Television series by Rocket Science Laboratories